El Capitolio, or the National Capitol Building (Capitolio Nacional de La Habana), is a public edifice in Havana, the capital of Cuba. The building was commissioned by Cuban president Gerardo Machado and built from 1926 to 1929 under the direction of Eugenio Rayneri Piedra. It is located on the Paseo del Prado, Dragones, Industria, and San José streets in the exact center of Havana.

History

The Havana Capitol building was built on land that was a railroad terminal and used to belong to the Villanueva Railway.
The project began in April 1926, during the Gerardo Machado administration. Construction was overseen by the U.S. firm of Purdy and Henderson. Prior to the Cuban Revolution of 1959, the Congress was housed in the building, the Congress was abolished and disbanded following the Cuban Revolution in 1959 and the building fell into disrepair.

"El Capitolio" has a size of 681 by 300 ft. Although its design is often compared to the United States Capitol, it is not a replica. "It is similar to that in Washington D.C, but a meter higher, a meter wider, and a meter longer, as well as much richer in detail. To finish its construction they needed more than 5000 workers, 3 years, 3 months and 20 days; as well as approximately 17 million  American dollars". Completed in 1929, it was the tallest building in Havana until the 1950s. It houses the world's third largest indoor statue.

On August 30, 2019, the historian of the city Eusebio Leal proclaimed the end of the renovation with the unveiling of the dome.

Building

The cupola, which is stone-clad around a steel frame that was constructed in the United States, is set planimetrically forward on the building to allow for the apse that contains La Republica, the "Statue of the Republic". The Capitolio had the third-highest dome in the world at the time of its construction. According to Eugenio Rayneri Piedra, the inspiration for the cupola came from the Panthéon in Paris by way of Bramante's Tempietto in San Pietro in Montorio.

The gardens, based on the designs of European gardens consisting of areas of lawn bordered by paths and highlighted by Royal Palm trees, were designed by French landscape architect Jean-Claude Nicolas Forestier who also designed the Paseo del Prado.

The 56 steps leading to the main entrance, La Escalinata, is flanked by  statues by the Italian artist Angelo Zanelli. To the left is Work (El Trabajo) and to the right The Tutelary Virtue (La Virtud Tutelar). Beyond the portico, three large bronze doors with bas-reliefs by Zanelli allow access to the main hall.

The inside of the main hall under the cupola is the Statue of the Republic (La Estatua de la República). The statue, also by Zanelli, was cast in bronze in Rome in three pieces and assembled inside the building after its arrival in Cuba. It is covered with 22 carat (92%) gold leaf and weighs 49 tons. A Creole Cuban, Lily Valty served as the model for the body for Zanelli, and the inspiration for the statue came from Athena, the Greek goddess of wisdom.

Embedded in the floor in the center of the main hall is a replica 25 carat (5 g) diamond, which marks Kilometre Zero for Cuba. The original diamond, said to have belonged to Tsar Nicholas II of Russia and have been sold to the Cuban state by a Turkish merchant, was stolen on 25 March 1946 and mysteriously returned to the President, Ramón Grau San Martín, on 2 June 1946. To either side of the main hall is the Salón de Pasos Perdidos (Hall of Lost Steps), named for its acoustic properties. These halls, with inlaid marble floors and gilded lamps, lead to the two semicircular chambers that formerly housed the Parliament and Chamber of Deputies. The Parliament chamber to the right of the building is backed on to by the President's office which has a door opening directly onto the dais.

A range of different lamps is seen throughout the building. These were all designed specifically for the building by Cuban designers and the majority of them were manufactured in France.

In the center of the building are two patios which provide light and ventilation for the offices on the first (ground), third and fourth floors. The north patio features another statue The Rebellious Angel (El Ángel Rebelde) which was donated to the building after the inauguration. There is a small fifth floor and a sixth-floor which gives access only to part of the cupola.

Central portico

A wide granite staircase of 56 steps, 36 meters wide and 16 meters high, leads to the portico of the building. There are two rows of 6 columns of the Ionic order. The pillars stand out with a diameter of 1.55 meters and a height of 14.10 meters. Reasons for the hall, located in all the doors and the lateral panels, are the Boticcino marble squares sculpted by Angelo Zanelli.

On both sides of the end of the staircase are two bronze sculptural groups with granite pedestal by the Italian Angelo Zanelli, one male, and the other female, have a height of 6.70 meters and represent the first progress of human activity and the second the tutelary virtue of the people.

Statue of the Republic
Located in the apse, the Statue of the Republic is the figure of a young woman standing, dressed in a tunic, with a helmet, shield and lance; it weighs 30 tons, is 14.60 meters high, and rests on a marble pedestal of 2.50 meters.  It was sculpted by Angelo Zanelli, author of the Altare della Patria, part of the monument to King Victor Emmanuel II, in Rome. It is the third largest indoor statue in the world, surpassed only by the Buddha of Nara, Japan and the Abraham Lincoln statue in the Lincoln Memorial in Washington. D.C.

Gallery

See also

List of buildings in Havana

References

General

Cited

External links

Construcción del Capitolio Nacional de La Habana 1929
Cuba. Secretaría de Obras Públicas. Proyecto para la construcción de las Obras del Palacio del Congreso. Conjunto de Bocetos

Government buildings completed in 1929
Buildings and structures in Havana
Tourist attractions in Havana
Kilometre-zero markers
Neoclassical architecture in Cuba
Former seats of national legislatures
Cuba articles needing attention
Government buildings with domes
20th-century architecture in Cuba